Thomas Battam (1810 – 28 October 1864) was a British painter of miniatures. He was born in London. He produced copies in enamels, several of which were exhibited at the Royal Academy, London from 1833 to 1840. Battam later became art director at the Copeland porcelain factory, and was the founder, and president, of the Crystal Palace Art Union. He claimed to be the inventor of Parian Ware, an inexpensive substitute for marble. He died at Notting Hill, London, aged about fifty-four.

Sources
Source: D. Foskett, A Dictionary of British Miniature Painters Vol I, London (1972)

1810 births
1864 deaths
People from Notting Hill
English enamellers
19th-century enamellers
19th-century English painters